The 2015 V.League 1 (known as the Toyota V.League 1 for sponsorship reasons) season was the 59th season of the V.League 1, the highest division of Football in Vietnam. The season began on 4 January 2015 and finished on 20 September 2015.

Changes from last season

Team changes
The following teams have changed division since the 2014 season.

To V.League 1
Promoted from V.League 2
 Đồng Tháp
 Sanna Khánh Hòa
 XSKT Cần Thơ

From V.League 1
Relegated
 Hùng Vương An Giang

Rule Changes
In season 2015, a team standing on the 14th position was relegated to V-League 2. There was no play-off match as usual between team standing on 13th at V-League 1 and the second-position team at V-League 2.

Also, one club was only allowed to register 2 foreign players plus one naturalized player. Becamex Bình Dương and Hanoi T&T could register one more AFC player due to the qualification for AFC Champions League.

Teams
Đồng Tháp were promoted after winning the 2014 V.League 2 championship, but in November 2014 they decided to withdraw from the league altogether. They later revered their decision once sponsorship was found to fund the side for the coming season.

Stadia

Personnel and kits

Managerial changes

Foreign players
V.League teams are allowed to use two foreign players and one naturalised player

 Players who left their clubs after first half of the season.

League table

Positions by round

Result

Summary

Season statistic

Top scorers

Own goals

Hattrick

Awards

Monthly awards

Annual awards

Individual

Team of the Year

Team

Attendances

By club

By round

References

External links

 V-League 2015

2015
Vietnam
Vietnam
1